National Route 1() is a national highway in South Korea. It connects Mokpo, South Jeolla Province with the city of Paju in Gyeonggi-do. Before the division of the Korean peninsula, the highway ran until Sinuiju, North P'yongan Province, in present-day North Korea.

Section

South Korea 

 South Jeolla Province
 Mokpo - Muan - Hampyeong - Naju

 Gwangju
 Nam District - Seo District - Buk District - Gwangsan District

 South Jeolla Province
 Jangseong

 North Jeolla Province
 Jeongeup - Gimje - Jeonju (Wansan-gu) - Wanju County - Jeonju (Wansan-gu) - Wanju County - Iksan

 South Chungcheong Province
 Nonsan - Gyeryong

 Daejeon
 Yuseong District

 South Chungcheong Province
 Gongju

 Sejong City

 North Chungcheong Province
 Cheongju (Heungdeok-gu)

 Sejong City

 South Chungcheong Province
 Cheonan (Dongnam-gu)

 Sejong City

 South Chungcheong Province
 Cheonan (Dongnam-gu - Seobuk-gu)

 Gyeonggi Province
 Pyeongtaek - Osan - Hwaseong - Suwon (Jangan-gu - Paldal-gu) - Uiwang - Anyang (Dongan-gu - Manan-gu)

 Seoul
 Geumcheon District - Yeongdeungpo District - Mapo District - Eunpyeong District

 Gyeonggi Province
 Goyang (Deogyang-gu) - Paju

North Korea 
 North Hwanghae Province
 Changpung - Kaesong - Kumchon - Pyongsan - Sohung - Pongsan - Hwangju - Chunghwa

 South Pyongan Province
 Taedong

 Pyongyang

 South Pyongan Province
 Taedong - Pyongwon - Anju

 North Pyongan Province
 Pakchon - Chongju - Sonchon - Cholsan - Ryongchon - Sinuiju

Major intersections

 (■): Motorway
IS: Intersection, IC: Interchange

South Jeolla Province (South of Gwangju) 

  Motorway
 Mokpo Yudal-dong Mokpo Bridge (Goha-daero)
 Mokpo Yeonsan-dong Sapjin Industrial IS ~ Mokpo IC (Goha-daero)

Gwangju

South Jeolla Province (North of Gwangju)

North Jeolla Province

South Chungcheong Province (South of Daejeon)

Daejeon

South Chungcheong Province (South of Sejong City)

Sejong City·South Chungcheong Province

South Chungcheong Province (North of Sejong City)

Gyeonggi Province (South of Seoul) 

 Road names:
 Anseong Bridge - Daeseong Bridge section: Gyeonggi-daero
 Air Base IS - Seoksu station section: Gyeongsu-daero

Seoul

Gyeonggi Province (North of Seoul)

Media
 Road No. 1 (2010 South Korean television series)

See also
National Route 1
Seobu Ganseon Doro (Part of National Route 1)
 (Part of National Route 1)

References

AH1
 
1
Roads in South Jeolla
Roads in Gwangju
Roads in North Jeolla
Roads in South Chungcheong
Roads in Daejeon
Roads in Sejong
Roads in North Chungcheong
Roads in Gyeonggi
Roads in Seoul